{{Speciesbox
| image           = Symphyotrichum anomalum 33203725.jpg
| range_map       = Symphyotrichum anomalum distribution.png
| range_map_alt   = Symphyotrichum anomalum native distribution: US — Arkansas, Illinois, Kansas, Missouri, and Oklahoma.
| range_map_caption = Native distribution
| status          = G4
| status_system   = TNC
| status_ref      = 
| display_parents = 5
| genus           = Symphyotrichum
| parent          = Symphyotrichum sect. Symphyotrichum
| species         = anomalum
| authority       = (Engelm.) G.L.Nesom
| synonyms_ref    = 
| synonyms        = 
Aster anomalus Aster anomalus f. albidus 
}}Symphyotrichum anomalum (formerly Aster anomalus'') is a species of flowering plant in the family Asteraceae native to Arkansas, Illinois, Kansas, Missouri, and Oklahoma. Its flowers have lavender or blue to purple, seldom white, ray florets and cream or light yellow, then pinkish-purple disk florets. Its flowers are attractive to butterflies. The lower leaves have untoothed margins and are heart-shaped at the base.

Citations

References

anomalum
Flora of the North-Central United States
Plants described in 1843
Taxa named by George Engelmann